Ritz Carlton Bangalore is a five-star hotel in Bengaluru, India. It is the first Ritz Carlton hotel in India, with an investment of 750 crore. It is located in Bangalore Central Business District Residency Road, Shanti Nagar. Ritz Carlton is a reputed brand in luxury hospitality.

The Hotel

See also
List of hotels in Bengaluru
List of hotels in India

References

Chains
The Ritz-Carlton Hotel Company
Hotels established in 2013
Hotel buildings completed in 2013